Dejan Drakul (23 May 1988 – 27 May 2014) was a Bosnian-Herzegovinian football midfielder.

Club career
In February 2009, he signed a three-year contract with Slovak club 1. FC Tatran Prešov. In summer 2010 he returned to Bosnia and for the following two seasons he played with Sloboda Tuzla and Željezničar Sarajevo in the Bosnian Premier League.

International career
At national team level, he played for Bosnia and Herzegovina U21 team.

Death
Dejan Drakul died on 27 May 2014, in Bijeljina hospital after a long illness.

References

External links
Dejan Drakul profile at  

1988 births
2014 deaths
People from Gacko
Association football midfielders
Bosnia and Herzegovina footballers
Bosnia and Herzegovina under-21 international footballers
FK Velež Mostar players
1. FC Tatran Prešov players
FK Sloboda Tuzla players
FK Željezničar Sarajevo players
FK Sutjeska Foča players
Premier League of Bosnia and Herzegovina players
Slovak Super Liga players
First League of the Republika Srpska players
Bosnia and Herzegovina expatriate footballers
Expatriate footballers in Slovakia
Bosnia and Herzegovina expatriate sportspeople in Slovakia